Laemophloeus biguttatus is a species of lined flat bark beetle in the family Laemophloeidae. It is found in Central America and North America.

References

Further reading

External links

 

Laemophloeidae
Articles created by Qbugbot
Beetles described in 1827